The Tschaggunser Mittagsspitze is a  high mountain in the Rätikon mountain range of the Central Eastern Alps. It is located in the Austrian state Vorarlberg, south of the village Tschagguns in the Montafon valley.

Etymology 
The name of Tschaggunser Mittagsspitze may be traced to "peak ("-spitze") above which the sun culminates at noon ("Mittag-") as seen from Tschagguns".

Further reading 
 

Mountains of Vorarlberg
Mountains of the Alps